The 2018 Ladies Championship Gstaad was a women's tennis tournament played on outdoor clay courts. It was the 26th edition of the Ladies Championship Gstaad, and part of the International category of the 2018 WTA Tour. It took place at Roy Emerson Arena in Gstaad, Switzerland, from 16 July through 22 July 2018.

Points and prize money

Point distribution

Prize money

Singles main draw entrants

Seeds

 1 Rankings are as of 2 July 2018.

Other entrants
The following players received wildcards into the main draw:
  Leonie Küng
  Francesca Schiavone 
  Patty Schnyder

The following players received entry using a protected ranking into the main draw:
  Mandy Minella
  Zheng Saisai

The following players received entry from the qualifying draw:
  Valentyna Ivakhnenko
  Veronika Kudermetova
  Conny Perrin
  Sílvia Soler Espinosa
  Martina Trevisan
  Kathinka von Deichmann

Withdrawals
  Kiki Bertens → replaced by  Jil Teichmann
  Jennifer Brady → replaced by  Antonia Lottner
  Danielle Collins → replaced by  Tamara Korpatsch
  Beatriz Haddad Maia → replaced by  Tereza Martincová
  Alison Van Uytvanck → replaced by  Anna Kalinskaya

Doubles main draw entrants

Seeds

1 Rankings are as of 2 July 2018.

Other entrants 
The following pairs received wildcards into the doubles main draw:
  Amandine Hesse /  Leonie Küng
  Conny Perrin /  Katarzyna Piter

The following pair received entry as alternates:
  Tamara Korpatsch /  Diāna Marcinkēviča

Withdrawals 
Before the tournament
  Anna Kalinskaya
  Natalia Vikhlyantseva

Champions

Singles 

  Alizé Cornet def.  Mandy Minella, 6–4, 7–6(8–6)

Doubles 

  Alexa Guarachi /  Desirae Krawczyk def.  Lara Arruabarrena /  Timea Bacsinszky, 4–6, 6–4, [10–6]

References

External links 
 

Ladies Championship Gstaad
Ladies Championship Gstaad
WTA Swiss Open
Ladies Championship Gstaad
ladies